Henry I (c. 1175–1221), of the house of Millau, was the Count of Rodez and Viscount of Carlat from 1208 until his death. He was the son and successor of Hugh II. His mother was Bertrande d'Amalon.

In 1212 he married Algayette, heiress of Guy, lord of Scorailles, and she bore him his eventual successor, Hugh IV, and also a daughter, Guida, who married the troubadour Pons de Monlaur. Henry I died on the Fifth Crusade.

1170s births
1221 deaths
Counts of Rodez
Christians of the Fifth Crusade